Mirko Jurij (born 4 November 1973 in Australia) is an Australian retired footballer who is last known to have played for St George in his home country in 2014.

Career

Singapore

Convicted with attempting to fix a match while with Sembawang Rangers in autumn 2000, Jurilj failed to make the 22000 Singaporean dollars as his three bets did not come true and was sentenced to five months' jail by December where he shared a cell with six others, had to serve laundry duty, and became increasingly ill at one point. Despite claiming to not tried to have fixed a match, the Australian was never vindicated and was banned for life from Asian football but not worldwide, with FIFA saying that the ban was enough punishment. However, the Australian was banned worldwide in late June 2001 for seven months, which ended prematurely, ending during mid-August the same year.

Malaysia

A member of Johor in 1995 and 1996, the defender-cum-midfielder was set to be bought by the Southern Tigers for the 2004 Malaysia Premier League, but they reversed on the offer at the beginning of 2004.

Malta

Transferring to Pieta Hotspurs of the Maltese Premier League in summer 2002, Jurilj was named man of the match twice in his first three outings, solidifying his place in defense for the first team and drawing comparisons with Romanian import Lucian Dronca. Settling well into the country, he stated that "The overall technical ability of the players is quite good but what the teams here (in Malta) lack is physical preparation." Suspended for once for making insulting remarks to the referee, he split ways with Hotspurs at the start of 2003.

References

External links
 
 OzFootball Profile 
 SportsTG Profile

Australian expatriate soccer players
Singapore Premier League players
1973 births
Living people
Expatriate footballers in Singapore
Malaysia Premier League players
Association football defenders
Sydney Olympic FC players
Blacktown City FC players
Rockdale Ilinden FC players
St George FC players
Pietà Hotspurs F.C. players
Parramatta FC players
Australian expatriate sportspeople in Singapore
Australian soccer players
Expatriate footballers in Malta
Association football midfielders
Australian soccer coaches
Expatriate footballers in Malaysia
National Soccer League (Australia) players
Wollongong Wolves FC players
Sutherland Sharks FC players
Sembawang Rangers FC players
Sydney United 58 FC players
Australian expatriate sportspeople in Malaysia
Wollongong United FC players